Kamla is a given name and surname. Notable people with the name include:

Kamla Beniwal, the governor of the Indian state of Gujarat
Kamla Bhatt, Indian blogger acclaimed as India's first podcaster
Kamla Chaudhry (1908–1970), Indian short story writer
Kamla Nehru (1899–1936), wife of Jawaharlal Nehru and a freedom fighter
Kamla Persad-Bissessar (born 1952), Trinidad and Tobago politician and lawyer
Kamla Prasad (born 1954), Indian politician for the Barabanki
Rick Kamla (born 1969), television personality for NBA TV

See also
Kamala (name)
Komla, given name